Fath al-Mulhim Sharh Sahih Muslim is a commentary on Sahih Muslim, written by Shabbir Ahmad Usmani.

Muhammad Zahid Al-Kawthari regarded Allama Shabbir Usmani's incomplete commentary as the best on Sahih Muslim.

The work was complemented by a  six-volume work named Takmilat Fath al-Mulhim by Muhammad Taqi Usmani.

See also 
Deobandi hadith studies

References

Sunni literature
Deobandi hadith literature
Hadith commentaries